Rocio Parrado Guarnizo (born 29 November 1982) is a Colombian professional racing cyclist. She rides for the Itau Shimano Ladies Power Team.

See also
 List of 2015 UCI Women's Teams and riders

References

External links

1982 births
Living people
Colombian female cyclists
Place of birth missing (living people)
21st-century Colombian women